St. Andrew's Cathedral, or the Cathedral Church of St. Andrew, may refer to:

In Australia:
 St Andrew's Cathedral, Sydney
In Canada:
 St. Andrew's Cathedral (Victoria, British Columbia)
In England:
 Rochester Cathedral, before 1642
 Wells Cathedral, otherwise the Cathedral Church of St Andrew, Wells
In France:
 Avranches Cathedral, destroyed in early 19th century
 Bordeaux Cathedral, dedicated to St Andrew 
In Greece:
 St Andrew's Cathedral, Patras
In Japan:
 St. Andrew's Cathedral, Tokyo
 St. Andrew's Cathedral (Yokohama)
In the Philippines:
 St. Andrew's Cathedral, Parañaque
In Russia:
 Saint Andrew's Cathedral, Kronstadt 
 Saint Andrew's Cathedral (Saint Petersburg)
In Scotland:
 St Andrew's Cathedral, Aberdeen
 St Andrew's Cathedral, Dundee
 St Andrew's Cathedral, Glasgow
 St. Andrew's Cathedral, Inverness
 St Andrew's Cathedral, St Andrews
In Singapore:
 St Andrew's Cathedral, Singapore
In Spain:
 Cathedral of St Andrew and St Demetrius
In Ukraine:
 St. Andrew's Cathedral, Kiev
In the United States:
 Cathedral of St. Andrew (Little Rock, Arkansas)
 Cathedral Church of Saint Andrew (Honolulu), Hawaii
 St. Andrew's Cathedral (Silver Spring, Maryland)
 Cathedral of Saint Andrew (Grand Rapids, Michigan)
 St. Andrew's Cathedral (Jackson, Mississippi)
 St. Andrew's Cathedral, Philadelphia, Pennsylvania

See also 
 St. Andrew's Church (disambiguation)
 Saint Andrew Parish (disambiguation)